"Unkiss Me" is a song by American pop rock band Maroon 5. It is featured as the fourth track on band's fifth studio album, V (2014). Despite the song's popularity, it has never been performed live by the band.

Composition 
"Unkiss Me" starts off with a trap beat, which dissipates during the chorus in favor of a synth instrumental section. The entire song is more mid-tempo, along with the next track, "Sugar".

Lyrically, "Unkiss Me" is about a failed relationship, which Levine struggles to overcome. The song features Levine using his lower register in his voice more so than in other songs.

Reception 
"Unkiss Me" had a mostly positive reaction from critics, with some saying it was the best track on the album, although there were some more negative reviews. Brad Wete from Billboard nominated the song to be released as a single. It was noted as an album highlight by Jimmy Donnellin from Cultured Vultures. The song has been compared to Boys II Men.

Chart performance and streaming 

Due to the success of V, "Unkiss Me" (along with many other songs) charted due to strong sales numbers. It peaked at number 56 on the Canadian Hot 100 chart, and 15 on the South Korean Gaon Chart. The song has over 66 million streams on Spotify as of November 2022.

Charts

Personnel 
Credits are adapted from AllMusic.

Maroon 5
 
 Adam Levine – lead and backing vocals, additional drums, songwriting 
 Jesse Carmichael – keyboards, synthesizers, piano, backing vocals
 Mickey Madden – bass guitar 
 James Valentine – lead guitar, backing vocals 
 Matt Flynn – drums, percussion 
 PJ Morton – keyboards, synthesizers, piano, backing vocals 

Additional musicians

 Sam Farrar – backing vocals, programming
 Ross Golan – backing vocals, songwriting
 Johan Carlsson – songwriting, additional instrumentation, keyboards, mixing, production, programming, vocal production, backing vocals

Technical
this list may be incomplete list of credits

 Ryan Tedder – songwriting, production, additional instrumentation, programming
 John Armstrong – assistant
 Astma – additional instrumentation, production, programming
 Tim Blacksmith – executive production
 Max Martin – executive production, vocal production
 Noah "Mailbox" Passovoy – production
 Tom Coyne – mastering
 Danny D. – executive producer
 Eric Eylands – assistant
 Rachael Findlen – assistant
 Serban Ghenea – mixing
 Clint Gibbs – engineer
 John Hanes – mixing
 Seif "Mageef" Hussain – production coordination

References 

2014 songs
Maroon 5 songs
Songs written by Adam Levine
Songs written by Ross Golan
Songs written by Johan Carlsson (musician)